Eckenheim is a quarter of Frankfurt am Main, Germany. It is part of the Ortsbezirk Nord-Ost.

Eckenheim was suburbanized on April 1, 1910.

References

Districts of Frankfurt